Spice Girls in America: A Tour Story is a 1999 film documenting British girl group the Spice Girls on the American leg of their Spiceworld Tour.

Release 
The film was purchased by Channel 4 in May 1999, and premiered on 6 June 1999.

Critical response 
John Dingwall of the Daily Record found the film to be a "dull-as-dishwater look at life on the road with Britain's top-selling band." Stephen Pile of The Daily Telegraph similarly did not like the film, particularly what he saw as the "general wall-to-wall whingeing" of the band members.

See also
 Spice Girls filmography

References

External links

1999 television films
1999 films
British documentary films
Works about the Spice Girls
Documentary films about entertainers
1999 documentary films
Documentary films about women
1990s British films